The Deli or Deli Malay people (Jawi: ملايو ديلي) are a sub-ethnic group of Malays native to eastern coast of North Sumatra, particularly lives in Deli Serdang and Medan. The Deli culture began with the Sultanate of Deli, an Islamic kingdom established in North Sumatra in 1632 to 1946. Deli Malays known for its famous pantoum art until today's.

See also

Malay people

References

Indigenous peoples of Southeast Asia
Ethnic groups in Indonesia
Ethnic groups in Sumatra
Muslim communities of Indonesia
Malay people